The Roland TR-909 Rhythm Composer is a drum machine introduced by Roland Corporation in 1983, succeeding the TR-808. It was the first Roland drum machine to use samples for some sounds, and the first with MIDI functionality, allowing it to synchronize with other devices. Though it was a commercial failure, the 909 became influential in the development of electronic dance music genres such as techno, house and acid.

Design 
The 909 was designed by Tadao Kikumoto, who also designed the Roland TB-303 synthesizer. Chief Roland engineer Makoto Muroi credited the design of the analog and pulse-code modulation voice circuits to "Mr Ou" and its software to "Mr Hoshiai".

Whereas its predecessor, the TR-808, is known for its "boomy" bass, the 909 sounds aggressive and "punchy". It was the first Roland drum machine to use samples (prerecorded sounds), for its crash, ride and hi-hat sounds; other sounds are generated with analog synthesis. As the clap and snare are generated via the same noise source, they produce a phasing effect when played together.

The 909 was also the first Roland drum machine to use MIDI, allowing it to synchronize with other devices, or for sounds to be triggered by an external MIDI controller for wider dynamic range. Older Roland machines can be synchronized via its DIN sync port (a precursor to MIDI).

The 909 features a sequencer that can chain up to 96 patterns into songs of up to 896 measures, and controls including shuffle and flam. It features an improved accent feature, allowing users to accent particular beats or sounds.

Roland changed elements of the 909 in later revisions, correcting problems and adjusting sounds. Some users modify their machines to match sounds from earlier revisions.

Release 
The 909 was released in 1983 and retailed for $1,195 USD, . It was a commercial failure, as users preferred the more realistic sampled sounds of competing products such as the LinnDrum. Roland ceased production after one year, having built 10,000 units. The 909 was succeeded in 1984 by the TR-707, which uses samples for all its sounds.

Legacy 

Whereas the TR-808 was important in the development of hip hop, the 909, alongside the 303 synthesizer, influenced dance music such as techno, house and acid. According to Gordon Reid of Sound on Sound, "Like the TR-808 before it, nobody could have predicted the reverence in which the TR-909 would eventually come to be held." 

The first known commercial use of a 909 is on the album Remission by Skinny Puppy, released months after the 909 launch. In the late 1980s, the 909 was popularized by producers in Chicago and Detroit such as Derrick May, Frankie Knuckles and Jeff Mills, who bought second-hand units. As it was the first Roland drum machine to use MIDI, producers used the 909 as a hub to synchronize and sequence other machines, which Roland had not anticipated. The 909 has also been used in rock and alternative music; Mark Bell used it to create "militaristic" percussion for Björk's 1997 song "Hunter", and Radiohead used it on "Videotape", from their 2007 album In Rainbows. Mixmag described the American DJ and composer Jeff Mills as the "master" of the 909.

In 2017, Roland released the TR-09, a miniature version of the 909 with additional features.

References

Further reading

Grooveboxes
Drum machines
Electronic dance music
Hip hop production
Japanese inventions
MIDI instruments
Musical instruments invented in the 1980s
TR-909
TR-909